Oldsmar is a city in Pinellas County, Florida, United States. As of the 2020 census, the city had a population of 14,898. The Oldsmar name dates to April 12, 1916 when automobile pioneer Ransom E. Olds purchased  of land north of Tampa Bay to establish a planned community.

Geography

History
A number of archeological digs in the Oldsmar area revealed small campsites as well as permanent villages that date from the Archaic period (c. 8000 to 1000 BCE).

In 1916, Ransom E. Olds purchased 37,541 acres (151.92 km2) on the northern tip of Tampa Bay in order to design a planned community. The property appealed to Olds because of its proximity to several other towns (including Tampa and Tarpon Springs) as well as being located on the Tampa and Gulf Coast division of the Seaboard Air Line Railroad. The town went through a number of name changes. Initially, it was called R. E. Olds-on-the-Bay and then changed to Oldsmar. In 1927 the name was again changed, this time to Tampa Shores. And finally, in 1937, it went back to its old name of  Oldsmar.

Shortly after purchasing the property, Olds formed the Reo Farms Company (renamed Reolds Farms Company) in order to administer to the creation of his new town. Architects and city planners were hired to create drafts and laborers were hired for construction. The town possessed the staples of any small town, such as churches, schools, and a bank, as well as a railroad depot, sawmill, and dock facilities on the 10 miles of waterfront that faced Old Tampa Bay. Outside of town, tracts of land were parcelled up for agriculture. To advertise how good the land was for growing crops and raising livestock, the Reolds Farms Company built a model farm. On the farm was a herd of cattle, horses, pigs, and other livestock. They also had plots planted with potatoes, turnips, beets, celery, and citrus fruits, among other crops. An oil well was drilled but was never productive.

The company also initiated a large publicity campaign to attract Northerners into becoming residents. One of the more popular slogans used was "Oldsmar for Health, Wealth and Happiness." Tours were also planned with Pullmans chartered between Detroit and Oldsmar. To accommodate prospective residents and other tourists a 60-room hotel called the Wayside Inn was built.

Olds named some of the roads himself including Gim Gong Road, named after the horticulturalist Lue Gim Gong. Olds had hired Gim Gong to help set up the agricultural community.

In 1919, the city's first library was started by the Woman's Club. It would later be donated to the city in 1977.

Original city plans included a golf course and a luxury hotel on the bay, but neither were ever built. A sawmill and foundry were established that made cast-iron engines for tractors and grove heaters. The mill also produced the Olds Chair (also called the Oldsmar Chair). The chair was similar to the popular Adirondack chair and was made out of either yellow pine or cypress.

Olds provided financial backing for the Kardell Tractor and Truck Company to move into town. Renamed Oldsmar Tractor Company, Olds had hoped it would devise a machine to clear out palmetto roots, pine stumps, and other scrub, which all had to be removed by hand otherwise. Eventually, Oldsmar had dairy and agricultural farms and, in the early days, it was a common sight to see cattle and hogs running loose through the town. Aside from peppers, tomatoes, corn, gladiolus, and grapes, a banana plantation was established but the winters proved too harsh and the crops failed.

In 1921, a hurricane hit Tampa Bay. Some of the homes that survived the storm were moved, by barge, to St. Petersburg in the following two decades. 

Olds spent a reported $100,000 drilling an oil well that never yielded. The well is now capped and sits on the grounds of the Tampa Bay Downs Racetrack. Other such wells were dug in Florida; two in the Panhandle and one in Sarasota, but none of them possessed the technology to drill through the Florida aquifer. 

By 1923, Olds had over $4.5 million invested in the community and there was only a population of around 200 inhabitants. When he realized Oldsmar was not growing as anticipated, he began liquidating his assets by first selling unplatted parcels of land. The racetrack was nearly completed when he traded it for the Fort Harrison Hotel in Clearwater. The rest of the land was traded for the Belerive Hotel in Kansas. By the time Olds left town, he had suffered a loss of nearly $3 million. While Olds envisioned a city of 100,000, the population was around 200 when he left.

Harry A. Prettyman, a St. Louis promoter, and his associates continued to sell lots in town following Olds's departure. Prettyman staged promotional gimmicks like Gold Rushes where pieces of gold were buried on a vacant lot and everyone got to dig for it. In 1927 Prettyman was caught selling underwater lots. To avoid scandal, the town of Oldsmar was renamed Tampa Shores. It wasn't until 1935 that the last of the property owned by Olds was finally sold.

Christmas 2020 attempt to poison water supply
The city's water supply computer system was hacked starting on December 20, 2020, until February 16, 2021. The attacker, who could have been anywhere in the world, attempted on February 5 to poison the water by raising the amount of lye to a lethal level. One report says that this was done using TeamViewer remote control software, legitimately installed to allow remote working. The hack was detected by a worker seeing it on his computer screen being carried out, and reversed immediately. City officials said that even if the hack had succeeded, automatic pH checking would have caught it in the 24 hours before the poisoned water reached consumers. The criminals were able to access the system due to lax security and shared passwords. The FBI said "the cyber actors likely accessed the system by exploiting cybersecurity weaknesses including poor password security, and an outdated Windows 7 operating system to compromise software used to remotely manage water treatment. The actor also likely used the desktop sharing software TeamViewer to gain unauthorized access to the system."

Demographics

According to the 2020 United States census, Oldsmar City had a population of 14,898 with 5,464 households. There were 2.69 persons per household. 

6.5% of the population were under 5 years old, 20.4% were under 18 years old, and 14.1% were 65 years and older. 52.3% of the population were female persons. There were 696 veterans living in the city. 8.3% of the population under the age of 65 lived with a disability. 13.5% of the population under the age of 65 did not have health insurance. 

80.4% of the population were white, 5.7% were black or African American, 2.4% were Asian, 0.4% Native Hawaiian or other Pacific Islander, 9.1% were two or more races, and 16.3% were Hispanic or Latino. 9.7% of the population were foreign born persons. 

The median value of owner-occupied housing units was $272,800. The median selected monthly owner costs with a mortgage was $1,649. The median selected monthly owner costs without a mortgage was $471. The median gross rent was $1,199. The median household income was $67,389 and the per capita income was $35,312. 10.3% of the population lived behold the Poverty threshold. 96.7% of the households had a computer and 91.8% had a broadband internet subscription. 93.5% of the population over the age of 25 had a highschool degree or higher. 34.6% of that same population had a Bachelor's degree or higher.

Economy
Oldsmar hosts an office of Nielsen Media Research. Most of the employees of Nielsen Media Research work in Oldsmar and the company's media measurement work originates from the office. The Associated Press said that the Oldsmar building, with a cost figure of $80 million, was its "nerve center." In 2003 the company moved into its Oldsmar complex and consolidated its employees there, with workers from Dunedin and other areas in Pinellas County moving into the Oldsmar building. Major defense contractor and aerospace company Lockheed Martin has a facility in Oldsmar that employed over 600 people as of 2015.

Culture
Oldsmar celebrates its history every year with Oldsmar Days and Nights, including parades, car shows (featuring the Oldsmobile), and carnival rides. The celebration is held in Spring.

Education
Oldsmar is part of the Pinellas County Schools district and is served by Countryside High School, along with sections served by East Lake High School.

Notable people

 Troy Baxter Jr., professional basketball player
 Francis Biondi, Finalist on FOX's MasterChef US Season 5 and professional golfer
 John Brown, professional basketball player  
 Cito Gaston, MLB all-star outfielder, two-time World Series Champion and first African-American manager to win a World Series
 Justin James, professional basketball player
 Gene Michael, professional baseball player, and former manager of the New York Yankees
 Artavis Scott, NFL wide receiver
 Nathan Harriel, MLS defender for Philadelphia Union.

Gallery

References

External links

 City of Oldsmar official website
 Oldsmar 100 Centennial 1916 - 2016 official website

Cities in Pinellas County, Florida
Populated places on Tampa Bay
Cities in Florida
Populated places established in 1916
1916 establishments in Florida